The James Bridge Copper Works was a copper refining plant in Walsall, Staffordshire, England.  It was established as a smelting plant in 1917 on a site formerly used for ironstone and coal mining and as a brickworks.  From 1920 it was owned by the Wolverhampton Metal Company who expanded the works.  It was temporarily closed in 1931–2 because of local pollution issues and during the Second World War due to blackout regulations.  After the war the plant specialised in reclamation of copper from waste materials and became a leader in that field, helping to alleviate a national shortage of copper; by 1964 the plant had electrowinning facilities.  The works were purchased by Imperial Metal Industries Limited in 1967 and the electrowinning facilities were greatly expanded over the following decades.  The site closed in 1999.

The site had been heavily contaminated by its industrial use and came into the ownership of Walsall Council, who proposed remediation works by 2011, and Homes England.  The site, known as Phoenix 10, was proposed for redevelopment into commercial units and permission for this was granted in April 2021.  Henry Boot plc commenced remediation works in May 2021.

Copper works 

A copper works was established on the site, in western Walsall, Staffordshire, in 1917.   The site was located adjacent to the Walsall Canal and utilised an old canal basin, formerly used by ironstone mines in the area, to unload coal that fuelled the works.  The site was previously occupied by the James Bridge Colliery and James Bridge Brickworks.  The colliery had closed in 1901 and the brickmakers around 1897. At the time the copper works opened the surrounding area was used for gravel and sand extraction.

The copper works helped meet the increased demand from the First World War.  The works was purchased by the Wolverhampton Metal Company in 1920 and a new smelter erected.  In 1931 the works, which by then employed 150 workers, were closed following complaints from Walsall Town Council.  The council complained about the odour from the smelting of copper ore with high sulphur content and about soot from the works'  chimney falling onto the town.  Taller chimneys were erected at the site and the works resumed production in 1932.

The works were closed during the Second World War due to the impact of blackout regulations.  It reopened after the war to salvage copper from war surplus material and James Bridge Copper Works was floated as a public company in 1946.  In the post-war years the works pioneered new smelting processes and became leaders in the reclamation of copper from waste material.  They were able to recover copper from lower-grade material than any other plant in the country. The James Bridge works processed ash and residue from other foundries and old car parts brought to the site by road and rail to produce copper of up to 80% purity.  This helped to ease a national shortage of copper and reduced the need for imports from abroad.  The James Bridge works also recovered other metals from the raw material, steel was sold on while aluminium was sent to the Wolverhampton Metal Company for further processing.  By 1964 the works had electrowinning facilities in addition to the smelters and manufactured anodes, cathodes and rough cake.  Nickel(II) sulfate was produced as a by-product from the electrowinning process.

Imperial Metal Industries Limited (IMI) purchased the Wolverhampton Metal Company in 1967, having been attracted by the James Bridge site. A new refining tank was opened in 1968, designed to produce  of copper per year. This was constructed adjacent to the existing facilities, which allowed for the works to carry out low- and high-purity refining simultaneously for the first time. The James Bridge Copper Works became IMI Refiners Ltd on 1 October 1971. The parent company continued to invest heavily in the works and in 1984 introduced a largescale continuous copper anode casting line, one of only three in the world. This development cost £3.4 million and was part-funded by a £400,000 industrial development grant from the British government. Later a £758,586 three-year project was carried out to implement a continuous copper strip casting line, part-funded by a £252,862 government grant. The James Bridge Copper Works closed in 1999.

Redevelopment 

The site has sat unused since the closure of the works and has been described by the West Midlands Combined Authority (WMCA) as "one of the biggest derelict sites in the Black Country".  By 2019 the  site was jointly owned by Walsall Council and Homes England and was known as the Phoenix 10 site.  The site has been heavily contaminated by its industrial use and Walsall Council leader Mike Bird described it as the "most contaminated site in Europe".  The site currently poses no risks to surrounding land but concerns have been raised over the potential for release of contaminants into the atmosphere and water supplies if the site was to be developed.  Walsall Council has been trying to carry out remediation to the contaminated site since circa 2011.

A redevelopment of the site into  of commercial units was proposed in 2019.  The regeneration would be part-funded by WMCA and carried out by Henry Boot plc.  The WMCA described the site, which has the potential to create 1,100 permanent jobs, as the "largest potential employment site in the Black Country and one of the largest brownfield employment opportunities in the West Midlands".  Contracts between Walsall Council and Henry Boot were signed in 2021, the works will cost around £100 million and will be part-funded by the WMCA and the Black Country Local Enterprise Partnership.  Henry Boot submitted a planning application for the works in January 2021.  Some local residents objected to the application because of the loss of vegetation and possible traffic, parking and dust during construction; the Birmingham and Black Country Wildlife Trust also objected on the grounds of habitat loss.  Council planning officers recommended that the application was granted and councillors approved it on 30 April 2021.  Remediation works began on site by May 2021 with groundworks for the units due to begin in 2023 and completion scheduled for 2027.

References 

Copper smelters
1917 establishments in England
1999 disestablishments in England
Metal companies of the United Kingdom
Buildings and structures in Walsall